This article contains an ongoing episode listing to the 2007 Japanese animated television series Tōka Gettan based on the adult visual novel of the same name. The anime was produced by the Japanese animation studio Studio Deen and aired between April 3 and September 24, 2007. The series contains 26 episodes and is directed by Yūji Yamaguchi. The episodes of the anime were aired in an anachronic and nonlinear order: chronologically, episode 26 is first, then 24 through episode one, and episode 25 is last.

Episodes

References 

Toka Gettan